Saier may refer to:
Vic Saier (1891–1967), American baseball player
Saier, Iran, a village in Golestan Province